4th Gaumee Film Awards ceremony, honored the best Maldivian films released between 2003 and 2005. The ceremony was held on 29 December 2007.

Winners and nominees

Main awards
Nominees were announced in November 2007.

Technical awards

Short film

See also
 Gaumee Film Awards

References

Gaumee Film Awards
2007 film awards
December 2007 events in Asia
2007 in the Maldives